Adam Kidan (born 30 July 1964) is an American business executive and lawyer who is the current president of Empire Workforce. He is also the current vice chairman of the Staffing Advisory Group.
 
Previously, he served as the president of Atlantic & Pacific Mattress Co.

Early life and education 
Kidan spent his early life in Brooklyn, New York. He attended John Dewey High School and was the president of the Social Science Club and editor-in-chief of the school newspaper, The Gadfly. In 1998, Kidan returned to John Dewey High School as graduation keynote speaker.

He went to college at George Washington University, and received a Juris Doctor from Brooklyn Law School along with the American Jurisprudence Award in legal writing and research in 1989. He was also active in the national office of College Republicans.

Career
Kidan campaigned for George H. W. Bush as Chairman of Young Professionals for Bush and served as New York Co-Chair of Youth For Reagan/Bush '84. 

In 1989, Kidan started his practice as a lawyer. He later started a bagel business, New York City's Best Bagels, opening two stores in the New York resort community of the Hamptons while he was practicing law. He sold the business to focus on his career.

In 1994, Kidan opened a Dial-A-Mattress franchise in Washington, D.C.

In July 1999, he sold his franchise to Dial-A-Mattress, the parent company.

In September 2000, Kidan, along with American lobbyist Jack Abramoff, acquired SunCruz Casinos. 

In 2005, conspiracy charges were brought against Kidan in connection to SunCruz Casinos sale. On December 15, 2005, he pleaded guilty to fraud and conspiracy charges; as part of a plea bargain, four other felony counts against him were dropped. In March 2006, Kidan was sentenced to five years and 10 months in prison, the same sentence as Abramoff. He served 31 months in prison before being paroled in 2009.
 
In 2010, Kidan was subpoenaed to testify in the conspiracy trial of former House Majority Leader Tom DeLay, for whom he had once been a major fundraiser, concerning DeLay's personal relationship with Abramoff.

Between 2012 and 2018, Kidan was the chairman of Chartwell Staffing.

Fictional portrayals
Kidan was portrayed by Jon Lovitz in the 2010 biopic/political satire Casino Jack.

References

Living people
George Washington University alumni
Brooklyn Law School alumni
21st-century American businesspeople
People from Brooklyn
Disbarred American lawyers
New York (state) Republicans
American people convicted of fraud
American businesspeople convicted of crimes
1964 births
John Dewey High School alumni
Prisoners and detainees of the United States federal government